Herbert Heidenreich (born 15 November 1954 in Euben) is a retired German football player. He spent seven seasons in the Bundesliga with Borussia Mönchengladbach and 1. FC Nürnberg.

Honours 
 European Cup finalist: 1976–77
 Bundesliga champion: 1976–77
 Bundesliga runner-up: 1977–78
 DFB-Pokal finalist: 1981–82

References

External links 
 

1954 births
Living people
People from Bayreuth (district)
Sportspeople from Upper Franconia
German footballers
Association football midfielders
Association football forwards
Bundesliga players
2. Bundesliga players
Borussia Mönchengladbach players
Tennis Borussia Berlin players
1. FC Nürnberg players
Footballers from Bavaria
20th-century German people